Slobodan Dogandžić (born 16 September 1944) is a Serbian former football manager and player.

Playing career
Born in Užice, Dogandžić started out at his hometown club Sloboda, playing alongside Radomir Antić, Milovan Đorić, Miroslav Vukašinović, and Milan Živadinović, among others. He subsequently moved to Čelik Zenica in 1970. Two years later, Dogandžić switched to Olimpija Ljubljana. He collected nearly 200 appearances for the Zmaji in the Yugoslav First League over the course of seven seasons. In late 1978, Dogandžić moved to the United States and joined the San Diego Sockers. He retired from professional football in 1981.

Managerial career
After hanging up his boots, Dogandžić was manager of numerous clubs, including Olimpija Ljubljana and Sloboda Užice. He also served as manager of Siirtspor (Turkey).

References

External links
 

1944 births
Living people
Sportspeople from Užice
Yugoslav footballers
Serbian footballers
Association football defenders
FK Sloboda Užice players
NK Čelik Zenica players
NK Olimpija Ljubljana (1945–2005) players
San Diego Sockers (NASL) players
Yugoslav Second League players
Yugoslav First League players
North American Soccer League (1968–1984) players
North American Soccer League (1968–1984) indoor players
Yugoslav expatriate footballers
Expatriate soccer players in the United States
Yugoslav expatriate sportspeople in the United States
Yugoslav football managers
Serbia and Montenegro football managers
Serbian football managers
FK Leotar managers
NK Olimpija Ljubljana (1945–2005) managers
FK Bečej managers
FK Sloboda Užice managers
FK Železnik managers
FK Smederevo managers
Siirtspor managers
FK Mladost Apatin managers
FK Lovćen managers
FK Radnički Niš managers
FK Radnički 1923 managers
Süper Lig managers
Serbia and Montenegro expatriate football managers
Serbian expatriate football managers
Expatriate football managers in Turkey
Expatriate football managers in Montenegro
Serbia and Montenegro expatriate sportspeople in Turkey
Serbian expatriate sportspeople in Montenegro